Butterfly House is the sixth full-length studio album by English indie rock band The Coral. The album was produced by John Leckie, whose previous collaborators include The Stone Roses and Radiohead. and was recorded at RAK studios in London as well as Rockfield in South Wales. It was released on 12 July 2010 to great critical acclaim. The album was recorded through a two-year span where the band road-tested the material. This is The Coral's first album without Bill Ryder-Jones, who departed in 2008. It peaked at #16 in the UK Album Charts but has since been a consistent seller for Deltasonic Records. The single, "1000 Years", reached #188 on the UK Singles Chart.

Background
The Coral released their fifth studio album Roots & Echoes in August 2007, reaching number eight in the UK Albums Chart. Out of its three singles, "Who's Gonna Find Me" charted the highest, reaching number 25 in the UK. They promoted the album with a tour of the United Kingdom two months later; by January 2008, guitarist Bill Ryder-Jones left the band, citing panic attacks. XFM reported that they had demoed material for their next album, which they were expecting to release later that year. Frontman James Skelly said they wanted to produce the album themselves and record it in April 2008. Following this, they rented small houses in locations such as the Lake District and Wales to write more material.

In January 2010, NME reported that the band had been working on their next album with producer John Leckie.

Release
On 6 April 2010, Butterfly House was announced for release in three months' time. On 11 May 2010, "Butterfly House" was made available as a free download through the band's website. "1000 Years" was released was the album's lead single on 5 July 2010. They appeared at the T in the Park festival, where they debuted "Roving Jewel", "Two Faces", "She's Comin' Around" and "1000 Years". Butterfly House was released on 12 July 2010. It was promoted with a short, five-date UK tour. Shortly afterwards, the band headlined Kendal Calling and appeared at the Latitude, Summer Madness and V festivals. In November 2010, they embarked on another short UK tour. An acoustic version of the album, recorded and mixed in a single day, was released on 6 December 2010. Skelly explained that after they did some acoustic shows, people were asking if they were going to record the new songs in that style. After playing three warm-up shows, the band appeared as the Glastonbury Festival in June 2011. They then supported the Courteeners for a one-off gig at the Haigh Hall in Wigan at the end of the month. In August 2010, the Coral performed at the Field Day and Cropredy festivals.

Reception

Butterfly House was met with generally favourable reviews from music critics. At Metacritic, which assigns a normalized rating out of 100 to reviews from mainstream publications, the album received an average score of 73, based on eight reviews. AnyDecentMusic? gave it a score of 6.7, based on 27 reviews.

Track listing

Butterfly House Acoustic
A stripped-down "acoustic" version of this album (with one extra track and different mixes) was also released on 13 December 2010 but did not chart.

Personnel
The Coral
 James Skelly – vocals, guitar
 Lee Southall – guitar, backing vocals, lead vocals on "Another Way"
 Paul Duffy – bass guitar, backing vocals
 Nick Power – keyboards, backing vocals
 Ian Skelly – drums, backing vocals, photography

Production
 John Leckie – producer, mixing
 Guy Massey – engineer, mixing
 Dan Austin – engineer
 Richard Woodcroft – engineer
 Darren Jones – assistant engineer
 Helen Atkinson – assistant engineer
 Ollie Buchanan – assistant engineer
 Robbie Nelson – assistant engineer
 Tim Lewis – assistant engineer
 Tom Fuller – assistant engineer
 Sean O'Hagan – arrangements
 Ian Broudie – arrangements
 Robin Schmidt – mastering

Additional musicians
 Scott Marmion – pedal steel
 Shaz – claps

Other personnel
 Michael Snowdon – design
 Alfie Skelly – photography

Chart performance

Release history

References

External links

 Butterfly House at YouTube (streamed copy where licensed)
 Butterfly House (acoustic) at YouTube (streamed copy where licensed)
 

2010 albums
Albums produced by John Leckie
Albums recorded at RAK Studios
The Coral albums
Deltasonic albums
Albums recorded at Rockfield Studios